This is a list of Bien de Interés Cultural landmarks in the Province of Alicante, Spain.

Archaeological Museum of Alicante
Atalaya Castle
Barxell Castle
Basilica of Santa Maria, Alicante
Castillo de Forna
Castle of Banyeres
Castle of Biar
Church of St Martin, Callosa de Segura
Concatedral de San Nicolás, Alicante
Cocentaina Castle
Lucentum
Archaeological Museum Camil Visedo
Misteri d'Elx
Orihuela
Orihuela Cathedral
Palace of the Counts of Cocentaina
Palmeral of Elche
San Jorge Bridge
Santa Bárbara Castle
Tibi Dam

References 

 
Alicante